The 2007 Supertaça Cândido de Oliveira was the 29th edition of the Supertaça Cândido de Oliveira, the annual Portuguese football season-opening match contested by the winners of the previous season's top league and cup competitions (or cup runner-up in case the league- and cup-winning club is the same). The match was contested between the 2006–07 Primeira Liga winners Porto, and the 2006–07 Taça de Portugal winners, Sporting CP.

The match took place on the 11 August at the Estádio Dr. Magalhães Pessoa in Leiria. The match which was televised on RTP1, saw Sporting CP defeat Porto 1–0, with a second half goal from Russian midfielder Marat Izmailov.

Match

Details

References

Supertaça Cândido de Oliveira
FC Porto matches
Sporting CP matches
2007–08 in Portuguese football